Klevis Gjoni (born 26 February 1987) is an Albanian footballer who most recently played as a midfielder for KS Lushnja in the Albanian First Division.

References

1987 births
Living people
Sportspeople from Lushnjë
Albanian footballers
Association football midfielders
KS Lushnja players
FK Tomori Berat players
Kategoria Superiore players